The Andean tinamou (Nothoprocta pentlandii) is a tinamou, found commonly in high-altitude shrubland, in the Andes of South America.

Taxonomy
All tinamou are from the family Tinamidae, and in the larger scheme are also ratites. Unlike other ratites, tinamous can fly, although in general, they are not strong fliers. All ratites evolved from prehistoric flying birds, and tinamous are the closest living relative of these birds. pentlandii is the Latin form of Pentland which commemorates the Irish Traveller Joseph Barclay Pentland.

Subspecies
The Andean Tinamou has seven subspecies as follows:
 N. p. pentlandii, the nominate race, occurs in the Andes of western Bolivia, northwestern Argentina, and extreme northern Chile.
 N. p. ambigua occurs in the Andes of southern Ecuador and northwestern Peru.
 N. p. oustaleti occurs on the west slope of the Andes in central and southern Peru.
 N. p. niethammeri occurs in coastal central Peru.
 N. p. fulvescens occurs in the Andes of southeastern Peru.
 N. p. doeringi occurs in the Sierras de Córdoba in San Luis and Córdoba Provinces, Argentina.
 N. p. mendozae occurs in the Andes of west central Argentina in Neuquén and Mendoza Provinces.

Description

Its upper parts are greyish-brown to olive brown and barred with black and white. Its breast is grey and spotted with white or buff, its belly is buff or whitish and its crown is black, the sides of its head and throat are mottled grey, and its legs are yellow.

Range and habitat
The Andean tinamou can be found in the Andes from southern Ecuador to central Chile, as well as in the Sierras de Córdoba in Argentina.

It prefers subtropical and tropical shrubland at  altitude.

Conservation

Footnotes

References

External links 
 BirdLife Species Factsheet
 Andean Tinamou - Saint Louis Zoo
 Andean Tinamou videos, photos & sounds on the Internet Bird Collection

Andean tinamou
Andean tinamou
Birds of the Andes
Birds of Argentina
Andean tinamou
Andean tinamou